The 1946 Richmond Spiders football team was an American football team that represented the University of Richmond as a member of the Southern Conference (SoCon) during the 1946 college football season. In their second year under head coach John Fenlon, the Spiders compiled a 6–2–2 record (3–2–2 against SoCon opponents), finished in sixth place in the SoCon, and outscored opponent by a total of 196 to 121. The team played its home games at City Stadium in Richmond, Virginia.

Schedule

References

Richmond
Richmond Spiders football seasons
Richmond Spiders football